The University of Finance and Administration (VŠFS)  is a private business school in the Czech Republic. It was founded by the Bank Academy and Czech Coal Group in 1999 and was one of the first private business schools in the country. It has had full university status from the accreditation committee of the Czech government since 2009.

History 
In 1998 the Czech government passed a new Tertiary Education Code, 111/1998 Sb., entitling private schools to offer higher education. The University of Finance and Administration was founded the next year.

VSFS expanded in 2001, opening new campuses in Most and Kladno. In 2002 the university entered into cooperation with the City University of Seattle in the United States, and in 2004 joined the Erasmus programme and European Credit Transfer and Accumulation System (ECTS). In 2009 VSFS received state approval of its doctoral program and became a university. Since September 2016, the VSFS has its branch in Karlovy Vary, the building is in the city center, on the T.G. Masaryk Avenue.

Study programs 
In addition to Bachelors and Masters study programmes, and a Doctoral Study Programme (Ph.D.), the university runs study programs for local and regional government bodies, accredited by the Ministry of the Interior.

Thanks to its cooperation with the City University of Seattle, VSFS also runs Master of Business Administration (MBA) and Bachelor of Science in Business Administration (BSBA) programs in English. These include MBA programs focused on Global Management, Financial Management or Marketing Management, and a BSBA program offered as a Double Degree, a combination of the Czech and English program.

Regional campuses 

The director of the campus in Most is Josef Švec, and the director of the campus in Karlovy Vary is Lenka Chlebková.

Erasmus partners 

 Belgium: EPHEC
 Finland: HUMAK University of Applied Sciences
 Finland: Savonia University of Applied Sciences
 France: Burgundy School of Business
 France: Douai Business School	
 France: Paris 12 Val de Marne University
 France: Groupe ESC Troyes
 France: Lille University of Science and Technology
 Hungary: Budapest College of Management
 Ireland: Maynooth University NUIM
 Iceland: Bifröst University
 Italy: Sapienza University of Rome
 Liechtenstein: Hochschule Liechtenstein
 Lithuania: Vilnius University
 Germany: Fachhochschule Ingolstadt
 Germany: University of Applied Sciences, Mainz	
 Germany: Beuth University of Applied Sciences Berlin	
 Germany: Chemnitz University of Technology
 Germany: Ravensburg University of Cooperative Education
 United Kingdom: University of Gloucestershire
 United Kingdom: Robert Gordon University
 Netherlands: Hogeschool Zeeland
 Poland: Opole University of Technology
 Poland: Wroclaw University of Economics	
 Austria: Fachhoschule des bfi Wien
 Slovakia: City University of Seattle
 Slovakia: Pan-European University
 Slovenia: GEA College of Entrepreneurship
 Spain: Polytechnic University of Valencia - Alcoy campus
 Spain: CEU San Pablo University - Madrid campus
 Turkey: Anadolu University

See also
 Education in the Czech Republic

References

External links 
VSFS Website
Information system (IS) VŠFS
VSFS International Students Club
ACTA of VSFS – R & D magazine

University of Finance and Administration
Business schools in the Czech Republic
Educational institutions in Prague
Educational institutions established in 1999
Universities in the Czech Republic
1999 establishments in the Czech Republic